Shackleton Glacier is a major Antarctic glacier, over  long and from 8 to 16 km (5 to 10 mi) wide, descending from the polar plateau from the vicinity of Roberts Massif and flowing north through the Queen Maud Mountains to enter the Ross Ice Shelf between Mount Speed and Waldron Spurs. The Roberts  Zealand GSAE (1961–62), who named it for  A.R. Roberts, leader at Scott Massif is a remarkable snow-free massif exceeding 2,700 metres (8,860 ft) and about 155 km2 (60 sq mi) in area. It was by the Southern Party of New USAS (1939–41) and named by US-SCAN for Sir Ernest Shackleton, Anglo-Irish Antarctic explorer.

See also
 List of glaciers in the Antarctic
 Mount Greenlee

References

Queen Maud Mountains
Glaciers of Dufek Coast